The 1998 Oklahoma state elections were held on November 3, 1998. The primary election was held on July 28. The runoff primary election was held August 25.

Overview

Executive Branch Before Election

Legislature Before Election

Executive Branch After Election

Legislature After Election

See also
Government of Oklahoma
Oklahoma House of Representatives
Oklahoma Senate
Politics of Oklahoma
Oklahoma Congressional Districts

 
Oklahoma

Oklahoma House of Representatives elections
Oklahoma Senate elections
Oklahoma